The Illawarra Folk Festival started in 1985 in Jamberoo, New South Wales. It has grown to become one of the largest festivals in Australia run entirely by volunteers from the Illawarra Folk Club Inc.

In 2007 it moved to Bulli. The festival now presents approximately 170 performers over four days on 13 stages in mid-January. It is one of the largest festivals in Australia run entirely by volunteers.

Performers, volunteers and audiences alike continue to return to the festival to experience and participate in the diversity of music and performances, and enjoy the intimate, vibrant, community atmosphere the festival has become renowned for.

Features
As well as performances by some of the best national and international traditional acts, the program features a two-day intensive folk school, workshops, sessions, dancing, the Youth Folk Traditions Awards, instrument makers, poets’ breakfasts, the famous Mediterranean Lunch, the infamous Tripe Dinner and beautiful international cuisine and craft stalls. The Music Train brings visitors from Sydney who are serenaded on the journey to Bulli.

The folk festival celebrates the Illawarra's rich mining history, trade union traditions, coastal environment and multicultural communities.

History 
The festival is run by the Illawarra Folk Club which formed in 1980 and has had various locations around Wollongong for its concerts, including:
 Coniston Hotel (first venue)
 Wollongong Tennis Club
 Bridge Theatre, Coniston
 Faces On Crown
 Wongawilli Community Hall
 Illawarra Leagues Club
 Illawarra Performing Arts Centre
 Fraternity Club
 Shellharbour Bowling Club
 Kembla Grange Golf Club
 Jamberoo Valley Lodge
 Mount Kembla Hotel
 Lysaghts Bowling Club
 The Ukrainian Club
 City Diggers Wollongong (current main venue)
The Folk Club draws its membership generally from the Illawarra region of New South Wales, Australia. It has presented the Illawarra Folk Festival at Jamberoo from 1985/86-2006 and at Bulli from 2007 to 2020, resuming in 2022. One folk festival was organised in 1985 at Wilton in association with the NSW Folk Federation and Bankstown Folk Club.

Club presidents have included:
 Alan Musgrove
 Kevin Baker
 Vince Brophy
 Anne Fox
 Peter Williams
 Peter Kerr
 Roger Fleming
 Russell Hannah

Illawarra Folk Festival directors have been
 Chris Cartledge (1986-1990)
 John Harpley (1991-1995)
 David De Santi (1996 to 2009)
 David De Santi (from 2009 as Artistic Director)
 Neil Rowsell (from 2009 as Project Manager)
 Peter Davis ( from 2014 as Treasurer )

Honorary life members
 Anne Fox +
 Mairi Petersen
 George Petersen +
 John Harpley
 Marie Harpley
 Dot Roberts
 Henry Roberts
 Russell Hannah
 Bev Hannah
 David De Santi
 Tania De Santi
 Kevin Baker
 Tony Foley
 Peter Butler
 Yvonne Butler
 Graeme Morrison
+ deceased

The club has also organised special folk music related tours over the years:	
 1989 Kuranda National Folk Festival Tour through northern NSW and Queensland
 1990 Adelaide National Folk Festival Tour via the Grampians, Murray River (houseboats) and the Great Ocean Road
 1994 Bushranger Tour to central NSW - Forbes, Eugowra, Carcoar
 2006 Tin Hare Tour to Cowra, Young
 2009 to 2013 Snowy Mountains of Music Festival

As of 2015, it spawned a fringe festival of activist street brass bands known as HONK! Oz, taking place in the nearby city of Wollongong. A number of bands from this fringe festival were also billed at Illawarra Folk Festival the following week.

Awards 
 2001 - Winner Events Category, Southern Illawarra Business and Tourism Awards
 2002 - Winner Significant Festivals and Events Category, Illawarra Tourism Awards for Excellence
 2004 - Events and Festivals Award of Distinction, Illawarra Tourism Awards
 2012 - Winner of the Events & Tourism Award, NSW/ACT Regional Achievement & Community Awards

References

External links 

 
 Illawarra Folk Club

Folk festivals in Australia
Festivals established in 1985
Tourist attractions in Wollongong
1985 establishments in Australia
Festivals in New South Wales